Maria Francesca Guina Taruc (born May 21, 1998) is a Filipina actress, TV host, model and beauty pageant titleholder who was crowned Miss Freedom of the World Philippines 2018. A year later, she brought home the first crown of the Philippines in the Miss Tourism World Intercontinental 2019 pageant held in Nanjing, China.

Personal life 
Taruc hails from Angeles City, Pampanga and graduated in Holy Angel University with a degree in Mass Communication. She is the granddaughter of Luis Taruc, who was the leader of Hukbalahap in guerrilla operations against the Japanese occupants of the Philippines.

Filmography

Television

References 

Living people
1999 births
Kapampangan people
People from Angeles City
Binibining Pilipinas contestants
Filipino beauty pageant winners